The 2015 Asian Development Tour was the sixth season of the Asian Development Tour, a second-tier tour operated by the Asian Tour.

Schedule
The following table lists official events during the 2015 season.

Order of Merit
The Order of Merit was based on prize money won during the season, calculated in U.S. dollars. The top five players on the tour earned status to play on the 2016 Asian Tour.

Notes

References

Asian Development Tour
Asian Development Tour